Betty White's Off Their Rockers is an American comedy television series that began airing on January 16, 2012, on NBC. The series is hosted by Betty White, and is based on the Belgian television format Benidorm Bastards. As of 2014, the series moved to the cable network Lifetime.

During the course of the series, a total of 46 episodes of Betty White's Off Their Rockers aired over three seasons.

Series overview
{| class="wikitable plainrowheaders" style="text-align:center;"
! scope="col" style="padding: 0px 9px" rowspan="2" colspan="2" | Season
! scope="col" style="padding: 0px 9px" rowspan="2" | Episodes
! scope="col" style="padding: 0px 90px" colspan="3" | Originally aired
|-
! scope="col" | Season premiere
! scope="col" | Season finale
! scope="col" | Network
|-
| scope="row" style="background:#127fc0; color:#100; text-align:center;"|
| 1
| 12
| 
| 
| rowspan="2" | NBC
|-
| scope="row" style="background:#dbe9f4; color:#100; text-align:center;"|
| 2
| 14
| 
| 
|-
| scope="row" style="background:#CCCCFF; color:#100; text-align:center;"|
| 3
| 20
| 
| 
| Lifetime
|}

Episodes

Season 1 (2012)

Season 2 (2013)

Season 3 (2014–17)
On October 18, 2013, Lifetime revived the series for a twenty episode third season. Season 3 premiered on February 28, 2014. In 2014, amid the third season, the series took a three-year hiatus and resumed broadcast in September 2017.

References

General references

External links
 
 

Lists of American comedy television series episodes
Betty White